Baji is a 2015 Indian Marathi-language superhero film written and directed by Nikhil Mahajan and produced by Vivek Rangachari and Amit Ahirrao under the banner DAR Motion Pictures and Virtue Entertainment and it is the first ever Marathi superhero film.

The film stars Shreyas Talpade and Amruta Khanvilkar in lead roles while Jitendra Joshi plays the main antagonist.

This film marks the comeback of Shreyas Talpade in the Marathi film industry after seven years. It was said that director Ravi Jadhav, Nagraj Manjule and Girija Oak would be seen in the film.

Plot
The story of the film is based on the legend of a man who took it upon himself to protect the common man against oppression and injustice.
His sword, his bow-arrow and his white stallion live on to define him as Baji. Baji is known to guard and protect the people in his village. He fights to restore justice from a wicked villager named Martand, who is greedy to find the treasure hidden under the village.

Cast
 Shreyas Talpade as Baji / Chiddvilas(Chidu) / Akash
 Amruta Khanvilkar as Gauri
 Jitendra Joshi as Martand
 Ila Bhate as Chidu's Mother
 Ravi Jadhav as an engineer (guest appearance)
 Girija Oak as a girl in the carnival (guest appearance)
 Nagraj Manjule as Inspector Mahesh
 Shruti Marathe in an item number Masoli
 Mrinmayee Godbole in Aala Aala Re Baji song

Production
The film is being produced by Arun Rangachari, Vivek Rangachari, Aayush Maheshwari, Amit Ahirrao, Suhrud Godbole, Hrishikesh Kulkarni, Nikhil Mahajan under DAR Motion Pictures, Virtue Entertainment  Blue Drop Films and IME Motion Pictures production banner and the film is also presented by DAR Motion Pictures and Virtue Entertainment.

Baji is the second installment of Arun Rangachari and Vivek Rangachari under DAR Motion Pictures banner in the Marathi film industry. After, they produced two Marathi films Lalbaug Parel and Teecha Baap Tyacha Baap.

Soundtrack

The film's soundtrack and background score is composed by Atif Afzal and lyrics are penned by Shrirang Godbole.

Kollywood Singer Chinmayi makes her Marathi debut with this film. The first song, "Aala Aala Re Baji", sung by Shalmali Kholgade & Adarsh Shinde, was released on 30 December 2014. The second song, "Majha Baji", sung by Chinmayi who makes her debut in Marathi with the song, was released on 6 January 2015. The third Song, "Masoli", sung by Bela Shende, was released on 9 January 2015.

Track listing

Release
The film was released on 6 February 2015. It was released in 418 screens in Maharashtra along with Goa, Gujarat, Madhya Pradesh, Karnataka & Delhi. The first look Teaser of the film was released in theatres along with Shreyas Talpade's Home Production film Poshter Boyz and on Internet on 1 August 2014. Girish Kulkarni has rendered his voice to the first look teaser. Theatrical trailer of the film was released on 8 December 2014 on YouTube.

Box office
Baji opened to decent response at the box office.

References

External links
 

2015 films
2015 action films
2010s Indian superhero films
Indian action films
2010s Marathi-language films
Indian superhero films